Gregor Muir is Director of Collection, International Art, at Tate (based at Tate Modern), having previously been the Executive Director of the Institute of Contemporary Arts in London from 2011 until 2016. He was the director of Hauser & Wirth, London, at 196a Piccadilly, from 2004 - 2011. He is also the author of a 2009 memoir in which he recounts his direct experience of the YBA art scene in 1990s London.

Life and career

Gregor Muir curated the 2019 Andy Warhol exhibition at Tate Modern, which subsequently toured to Ludwig Museum in Cologne, AGO Toronto, and Aspen Art Museum. He has overseen the acquisition of numerous artworks into the Tate Collection, having led its international acquisition committees since 2017. While Executive Director of the ICA, Gregor Muir was responsible for exhibitions by Isa Genzken, Betty Woodman, Lis Rhodes, David Robilliard, Prem Sahib, Trojan, Bruce Nauman and Dennis Morris. In 2015 and 2016, Muir curated Frieze Talks, London, with a range of speakers including Wolfgang Tillmans, Anicka Yi and Lee Scratch Perry. 

At Hauser & Wirth (2004 - 2011), Muir curated and produced exhibitions of works by Henry Moore (at Hauser & Wirth Zurich and London), Andy Warhol, Joan Mitchell, Francis Picabia,  and emerging artists at the time such as Jakub Julian Ziolkowski and Zhang Enli. Muir was instrumental in programming 'Hauser & Wirth Coppermill', a vast industrial shed off Brick Lane in East London, with ambitious exhibitions by Christoph Buchel, Martin Kippenberger and Deiter Roth. He also curated group exhibitions such as 'Old School' (2007) bringing together seminal paintings by Old Master and Contemporary artists such as Bruegel, Cranach, John Currin and Elizabeth Peyton. In 2005, he curated 'London in Zurich' at Hauser & Wirth Zurich, featuring works by Lali Chetwynd (now Monster Chetwynd) and Daniel Sinsel.

Between 2001 and 2004, Muir was the Kramlich Curator of Contemporary Art at Tate Modern where he worked on numerous film and video acquisitions for Tate Collections (to include ambitious co-acquisitions of works across multiple museums by Bruce Nauman and Bill Viola), as well as curating contemporary art displays from the Tate Collection, including a special focus on Robert Morris' 1971 Tate Gallery exhibition and Carl Andre's 'Equivalent' series ("the bricks"). Along with Jessica Morgan he curated the exhibition 'Time Zones' at Tate Modern, one of the museum's first exhibitions dedicated to the moving image [featuring works by Anri Sala, De Rijke / de Rooij and Fiona Tan] as well as 'In-a-Gadda-da-Vida' at Tate Britain with Damien Hirst, Angus Fairhurst and Sarah Lucas.

In 1997, Muir worked at the Lux Gallery in Hoxton Square, in the emerging cultural quarter of Shoreditch, showing works by artist such as Kutlug Ataman, Jane & Louise Wilson, jodi.org and Carsten Holler.

In 1997, he co-curated 'Assuming Positions' at the ICA London, featuring works by Jorge Pardo, Tobias Rehberger and Piotr Uklański. Between 1996 and 1997, Muir curated the video programs 'Speaking of Sofas' and 'A Small Shifting Sphere of Serious Culture', including works by Tacita Dean, Peter Doig, Gillian Wearing and Jane & Louise Wilson. In 1994 he curated 'Liar', featuring works by Cerith Wyn Evans and Jake and Dinos Chapman, and in 1993 he curated 'Lucky Kunst', featuring artists such as Gary Hume and Sam Taylor-Wood.

Muir has also been a writer for numerous artist catalogues, as well as being a contributor to Parkett and frieze magazines.

Works

Reviews
 [Pay-for link]

References

External links
 ICA staff page
 Review of Lucky Kunst

British art curators
Living people
English curators
Year of birth missing (living people)